Journet may refer to:

Places
 Journet, a commune in the Vienne départment, France

People
 Charles Journet (1891-1975), Swiss Roman Catholic theologian and cardinal 
 Françoise Journet (died 1720), French operatic soprano singer
 Laurent Journet (born 5 February 1970), French swimmer
 Marcel Journet (1868–1933), French operatic bass singer
 Pierre Journet, justice of the Quebec Superior Court

See also